Thomas Cecil Chisholm (1888 – 24 November 1961) was a British journalist, publisher and author noted for his 1914 biography of Sir John French, and books on Repertory theatre, Economics, and Business.  His books on Retirement, published by Penguin Books sold well in the late 1950s.

Family 
He was the only child of John Christie Chisholm, a solicitor and Provost of Dalkeith and Jean Anderson, the first woman Provost of Dalkeith.

Education 
Chisholm was educated at George Watson's College, Edinburgh, afterwards Edinburgh University and finally Göttingen University

Career 
He initially worked for ten years as a journalist for newspapers in Bournemouth, Manchester and London and wrote his first book just before World War I.  For the next twenty years he was chairman and editorial director of the specialist Publishing House; Business Publications Ltd and wrote a series of books on Business Management. Finally Chisholm wrote on the Management of Repertory Theatre and two popular practical guides to Retirement, together with further books on Marketing and Advertising. He continued to work and travelled extensively researching material for his books until his death.

Marriage 
In 1921, at Hampstead, London. he married Mabel Capper, a former Suffragette and militant campaigner for women's rights.  There were no children from the marriage.

Death 
Chisholm died at home; Windrush Cottage, Fairlight, East Sussex on 24 November 1961.

Books

Notes

External links
 
 

1888 births
1961 deaths
People educated at George Watson's College
British biographers
British male journalists
British non-fiction writers
20th-century non-fiction writers
People from Dalkeith
People from Fairlight, East Sussex
Alumni of the University of Edinburgh
University of Göttingen alumni
Male biographers